Filip Wypych (born 20 April 1991) is a Polish swimmer. He represented his country at the 2016 Summer Olympics.

References

1991 births
Living people
Swimmers at the 2016 Summer Olympics
Olympic swimmers of Poland
Place of birth missing (living people)
Polish male freestyle swimmers
21st-century Polish people